Joseph Brady may refer to:

Sports
Joseph Brady (soccer), American football (soccer) player, got Olympic bronze medal in 1904
Joe Brady (American football coach) (born 1989), American football coach
Joe Brady (footballer), English footballer who played for Sheffield United between 1892 and 1893
Joe Brady (hurler) (born 1982), Irish hurler
Joe Brady (snooker player), Irish player of English billiards and snooker

Other
Joseph Brady (actor) (1928–2001), Scottish actor
Joseph Brady (author), pen-name of Irish writer Maurice Browne (1892–1979)
Joseph Brady (engineer) (1828–1908), Irish civil engineer active in Australia
Joseph V. Brady (1922–2011), American behavioral neuroscientist
Joseph Brady, American bridge player, won in 1996 Rockwell Mixed Pairs
Joseph Brady (1906–?), who got injured in 1946 in Crest Theatre
Joe Brady (Irish National Invincibles) (died 1883), member of the Irish National Invincibles

See also 

Joseph Brody (disambiguation)